Jean-Paul Faber (8 December 1930 – 19 February 2018) was a French sports shooter. He competed in the skeet event at the 1968 Summer Olympics.

References

1930 births
2018 deaths
French male sport shooters
Olympic shooters of France
Shooters at the 1968 Summer Olympics
Sportspeople from Marne (department)
20th-century French people